Aragats Gyumri FC, is a defunct Armenian football club from Gyumri, Shirak Province.

Aragats FC was founded in 1967 as the reserves club of FC Shirak. In 1973, the club was renamed Aragats Leninakan FC.

However, the club was dissolved in 2002 due to financial difficulties. Later, many former players of the club moved to Shirak-2 in 2007 to form the reserves team of FC Shirak.

League Record

References

Defunct football clubs in Armenia
2002 disestablishments in Armenia